Loch A' Chaorainn (Loch of the Rowan) is an impounding reservoir which lies  north west of Tarbert.

See also
 List of reservoirs and dams in the United Kingdom

Sources
"Argyll and Bute Council Reservoirs Act 1975 Public Register"

Chaorainn